Lambros Skordas, a Doctor of Dental Surgery, is the ex-chairman of Aris Thessaloniki Football Club, a major Greek club. He has connected his name with the club's rise and financial reform in recent years.

References
Official football website

Living people
Aris Thessaloniki
Aris Thessaloniki F.C.
Year of birth missing (living people)
Place of birth missing (living people)
Greek football chairmen and investors
Aris Thessaloniki F.C. presidents